The Tebicuary River (Spanish: Río Tebicuary), a tributary of Paraguay River is a river in Paraguay. Located in the southwestern part of that country,  it flows eastwards discharging to Paraguay River about 45 km south of Formosa and 30 km north of Pilar.

The San Rafael National Park in the river's upper basin.

See also
List of rivers of Paraguay

References

Rand McNally, The New International Atlas, 1993.

Rivers of Paraguay
Tributaries of the Paraguay River